Farm Boy is a novel by Michael Morpurgo, best known as being the sequel to the popular novel War Horse. The book was first published in the United Kingdom in 1997 by Pavilion Books Limited and is illustrated by Michael Foreman. It was not initially planned for Morpurgo to write a sequel to War Horse, but the story was inspired after receiving many enquiries about what happens to Joey, a horse in service of the Army (the main character from War Horse) after the Great War. In an article in ChronicleLive Michael Morpurgo also stated that his favourite of his own works was Farm Boy. The book captures modern life on a farm in rural Devon, where Michael Morpurgo lives, while having retrospective flashbacks to the lives of Albert and Joey (characters from War Horse). He stated in the article in ChronicleLive:
 
"I think Farm Horse because it’s about my home and because I know every lane, every hedge and every field in the book because it’s right outside my window. It’s very close to my heart and Michael Foreman’s illustrations are simply to die for. He really responded to it beautifully."

Farm Boy was republished in 1999 by HarperCollins Children's Book, though it was never as successful as the original novel.

Characters
Main protagonist – a young boy, who grows over the course of the story to become a young adult. He is the great-grandson of Albert. He lives in London, but often visits Grandpa over the summer and enjoys listening to his stories as well as helping him around the farm.Grandpa – The grandfather of the protagonist and the son of Albert. He regularly tells stories to the protagonist about his life and the stories he learned of his Father.Albert/Father/Corporal – The father of Grandpa and the original owner of Joey. He is a character from the book War Horse as well as this book. From when he first met Joey, he deeply cared about him, and went to extreme lengths to keep him safe and by his side. Albert is never referred to by his first name in the book. Instead he is either called Father by Grandpa, or the "Corporal" by townsfolk.Joey – the younger horse owned by Albert and the main protagonist from the prequel War Horse. While the first book is narrated by Joey, Farm Boy is narrated entirely by humans, and so Joey is more realistic in a sense from this book's perspective.Zoey – An old mare and the second horse that Albert owns. Zoey is older than Joey by about 5 years and was on Albert's farm when Albert was a child before Joey.Harry Medlicott – A rich neighbouring farmer. In the course of the book he begins to dispute with Albert, believing that his new tractor is far superior to Albert's horses Joey and Zoey.

Plot
The story begins in "Burrow", a farm house in Devon where the protagonist, a young boy at the beginning of the story, visits his Grandpa. The young boy enjoys regularly visiting his Grandpa, especially during the summer, and imagining himself driving the old green Fordson tractor in the back of the barn. It is acknowledged that this tractor is very important. The grandfather tells the protagonist the story behind how he loves swallows- that they were the first birds he ever saw and when his Father was young (the great-grandfather of the protagonist) the Father would go out and pinch the eggs of sparrows and rooks because they would always interfere with the farm; his Father would leave the swallows' nests alone because they never bothered his farm. In fact, Father even punched a friend for stealing from a swallow's nest, getting Father into trouble. Father is described as always managing to get into fights when he was younger.

The protagonist's Grandpa then went on to describe events between his own Father and a horse named Joey, indicating that the pair were Albert and Joey from the prequel. He describes the lengths his Father went to keep Joey safe, even joining the army to find Joey when he was taken away to be used in WWI. Father was only 14 years old at the time of joining the army and had to lie to get in. This section is primarily a flashback to the previous book and the events around and before the war, but from another perspective. After such events and the end of WWI, the protagonist's great-grandfather was commonly referred to as the "Corporal" by the townspeople.

Once the protagonist finishes school, now a young adult, he visits his Grandpa again during the summer. One day during this time Grandpa asks of the boy to help him to learn to read and write. When the Grandfather was a child he prioritised helping out on the farm with his Father as the Corporal had a lasting leg injury from the war and found it difficult to keep up with the work to be done. The Grandpa's wife attempted to teach him to read and write years later, after the protagonist's mother and her siblings had left the farm, but unfortunately died unexpectedly from a weak heart. This has left Grandpa distraught and embarrassed for many years. Grandpa makes a bet with the protagonist that if he can read Agatha Christie and even write a short story by Christmas he will give the boy a hundred pounds, and also offers to pay him during his time living and working on the farm to teach him to read and write.

Thanks to Grandpa's determination, on Christmas Eve he walks with the protagonist into the barn to read him Death on the Nile by Agatha Christie and by New Year he is able to read the book word for word. In February the boy chooses to travel to Australia and on the train he finds an envelope, containing the £100 from the bet and a story written by Grandpa.

The story is a recollection of how the Corporal, his two horses Joey and Zoey and his son (Grandpa) challenge an arrogant farmer, Harry Medlicott, in a bet where if the horses ploughed more than Medlicott's tractor, the Corporal receives his tractor. Despite determination from the Corporal, at the beginning of the bet the tractor easily pulls ahead, however after the break it refuses to start again. When the tractor starts back up again the Corporal is slightly in the lead, however Medlicott quickly catches, and the Corporal can no longer bear the strain due to his injury. Grandpa takes over and leads the horses in ploughing. In a surprising turn of events Medlicott accidentally tips the tractor over into a ditch, allowing Grandpa to just barely pull ahead and win. The tractor is the same one which resides in Grandpa's barn in the protagonist's time. This leads the protagonist to deciding to study engineering at college, before returning to the farm to live and work there while also fixing up the tractor so it is one day usable again.

Adaptation

The novel has also become an inspiration for a play  - the director Daniel Buckroyd's adaptation in October 2009 with New Perspectives Theater Company and another co-production with Scamp Theater in 2012. The play was a great success, having a great number of viewers in UK, reaching the Brits Off Broadway Festival – Christmas in New York City in USA.

Reception
Teenreads puts Farm boy in a positive light, stating "FARM BOY is a great book, perfect for a young adventurous reader who loves history, animals and family stories all put together. The prose may be easy to read, but the emotion is dug in as deeply as the burrows on Grandpa’s farm."

References

External links

Daniel Buckroyd - Mercury Theatre, Colchester
Scamp Theater

1997 British novels
Novels by Michael Morpurgo
Children's novels about animals
Farms in fiction
Novels about horses
Novels set in Devon